The 1995 XXXI FIBA International Christmas Tournament "Trofeo Raimundo Saporta-Memorial Fernando Martín" was the 30th edition of the FIBA International Christmas Tournament. It took place at Palacio de Deportes de la Comunidad de Madrid, Madrid, Spain, on 24, 25 and 26 December 1995 with the participations of Real Madrid Teka (champions of the 1994–95 FIBA European League), Australia, Rio Claro and Cuba.

League stage

Day 1, December 24, 1995

|}

Day 2, December 25, 1995

|}

Day 3, December 26, 1995

|}

Final standings

References

1995–96 in European basketball
1995 in Australian basketball
1995–96 in Spanish basketball